The Goddess Quandary is a Big Finish Productions audio drama featuring Lisa Bowerman as Bernice Summerfield, a character from the spin-off media based on the long-running British science fiction television series Doctor Who.

Plot 
Bernice visits the unstable planet Etheria to help a group of monks verify their claim to have found the last resting place of a mighty warlord. Soon she finds herself under threat from both the planet, its inhabitants and even from an old friend.

Cast
Bernice Summerfield - Lisa Bowerman
Ker'a'nol - Jane Goddard
Secundo - Duncan Wisbey
Parasiel - Paul Bryant
Aldebrath - Lizzie Hopley

External links
Big Finish Productions - Professor Bernice Summerfield: The Goddess Quandary

Bernice Summerfield audio plays
Fiction set in the 27th century